Tornodoxa leptopalta is a moth in the family Gelechiidae. It is found in Taiwan.

References

Moths described in 1934
Chelariini